The St. Peters AME Church in Harrodsburg, Kentucky, is a historic church at Lexington Street and US 127. It was added to the National Register of Historic Places in 1989.

It is an African Methodist Episcopal church.  The congregation was founded in 1839.  The present church was built by contractor George Sallee Jr., with work contributed by members of the congregation during 1917 to 1918.

References

Churches completed in 1918
20th-century Methodist church buildings in the United States
African Methodist Episcopal churches in Kentucky
Churches on the National Register of Historic Places in Kentucky
Neoclassical architecture in Kentucky
Churches in Mercer County, Kentucky
National Register of Historic Places in Mercer County, Kentucky
Neoclassical church buildings in the United States
Harrodsburg, Kentucky